Özkan Yorgancıoğlu (born 1 August 1954) is a Turkish Cypriot politician who has been Prime Minister of Northern Cyprus (TRNC) between 2 September 2013 and 16 July 2015. He is also the leader of the Republican Turkish Party.

Early life and education 
Yorgancıoğlu was born in 1954 in Lempa, a village in Paphos, the westernmost district of Cyprus, which was, at the time, a British crown colony. He studied at Istanbul University's Department of Economics and Public Finance, receiving his degree in political science in 1980.

Political career 
On 28 April 2005, Yorgancıoğlu was appointed Minister of Youth and Sports in the cabinet of TRNC Prime Minister (PM) Ferdi Sabit Soyer, who served from April 2005 to May 2009. In 2011, he replaced Soyer as Chairman of the Republican Turkish Party. After his party won the July 2013 legislative election, he became PM, replacing interim PM Sibel Siber on 2 September.

References

1954 births
21st-century prime ministers of Northern Cyprus
Government ministers of Northern Cyprus
Istanbul University alumni
Leaders of political parties in Northern Cyprus
Living people
Members of the Assembly of the Republic (Northern Cyprus)
People from Paphos District
Prime Ministers of Northern Cyprus
Turkish Cypriot socialists
Turkish Cypriot expatriates in Turkey